Éric Joseph Fichaud (born November 4, 1975) is a Canadian former professional ice hockey goaltender. He played 95 games in the National Hockey League with four teams between 1996 and 2000. He was selected in the first round of the 1994 NHL Entry Draft, 16th overall, by the Toronto Maple Leafs.

Junior career
Fichaud played net for the Chicoutimi Saguenéens in the Quebec Major Junior Hockey League. In 1994, he led his team to the Memorial Cup, winning a host of awards, including the Hap Emms Memorial Trophy as top goaltender and playoff MVP awards. A classic butterfly goaltender in the Patrick Roy mold, Fichaud looked to be a future National Hockey League starting netminder.

Professional career
Shortly after being drafted, Fichaud was traded to the New York Islanders for Benoît Hogue, a 1995 3rd round pick (Ryan Pepperall) and a 1996 5th round pick (Brandon Sugden), without ever playing a game for Toronto. Fichaud never lived up to the lofty expectations his fantastic junior career had led to, bouncing between the minor leagues and the NHL. Shoulder injuries played a key role, and despite Fichaud's best efforts, he was unable to recapture his previous form. Eventually, Fichaud settled into the role as the starting goalie for the AHL's Hamilton Bulldogs.

Career statistics

Regular season and playoffs

External links
 

1975 births
Living people
Canadian expatriate ice hockey players in Germany
Canadian expatriate ice hockey players in the United States
Canadian ice hockey goaltenders
Carolina Hurricanes players
Chicoutimi Saguenéens (QMJHL) players
Hamilton Bulldogs (AHL) players
Ice hockey people from Montreal
Krefeld Pinguine players
Manitoba Moose players
Milwaukee Admirals (IHL) players
Montreal Canadiens players
Nashville Predators players
National Hockey League first-round draft picks
New York Islanders players
People from Anjou, Quebec
Quebec Citadelles players
Quebec RadioX players
Toronto Maple Leafs draft picks
Utah Grizzlies (IHL) players
Worcester IceCats players